Barbara Tabita (born 13 February 1975) is an Italian actress, comedian and playwright.

Life and career 
Born in Augusta, Sicily, Tabita studied acting at the drama school of the Teatro Stabile di Catania. She made her film debut in 2000, in the comedy film Come se fosse amore. Her varied career includes films, TV-series, stage plays, musicals, and television programs.

Selected filmography 

 La piovra,  (2001)  
 Ho visto le stelle! (2003)  
 Incantesimo (2005-2006) 
 I Love You in Every Language in the World (2005)  
 Il 7 e l'8 (2007)  
 Me and Marilyn  (2009)  
 Natale in Sudafrica (2010)
 I Cesaroni 4 (2010)
 The Mafia Kills Only in Summer (2013)
 Italo  (2014) 
 Italiano medio  (2015)
 Belli di papà (2015)

References

External links 
 
 

Italian film actresses
Italian television actresses
Italian stage actresses
1975 births 
Living people